The Zhongchuan–Majiaping railway is a single-track railway line in Yongdeng County, Lanzhou, Gansu, China. It is used exclusively for freight. At its western terminus, the line connects to the Lanzhou–Xinjiang railway. At its eastern end, the line continues east as the Zhujiayao–Zhongchuan railway.

References

Railway lines in China
Railway lines opened in 2013
Transport in Gansu